Wild silks have been known and used in many countries from early times, although the scale of production is far smaller than that from cultivated silkworms.  Silk cocoons and nests often resemble paper or cloth, and their use has arisen independently in many societies.

Background

Silk taken from various species has been used since ancient times, either in its natural state or after some form of preparation.  Spider webs were used as a wound dressing in ancient Greece and Rome, and as a base for painting from the 16th century. Caterpillar nests were cut and pasted together to make a paper-like fabric in the Aztec Empire.

To make a woven fabric, silk threads must first be either carded and spun, or extracted as a single intact thread. Commercially reared silkworms of the species Bombyx mori (Linnaeus, 1758) are normally killed before the pupae emerge, either by pricking them with a needle or dipping the cocoons into boiling water, thus allowing the whole cocoon to be unravelled as one continuous thread. This allows a much finer cloth to be woven from the silk.

There are more than 500 species of wild silkworms in the world, although only a few are used to produce cloth. They usually produce a tougher and rougher silk than that from domesticated B. mori. Wild silks are usually harvested after the moths have left the cocoons, cutting the threads in the process, so that there is not one long thread, as with domesticated silkworms.  
	
Wild silks are more difficult to bleach and dye than silk from Bombyx mori, but most have naturally attractive colours, particularly the rich golden sheen of the silk produced by the muga silkworm from Assam, often known as Assam silk.

The cocoon shells of wild silk moths are toughened or stabilized either by tanning (cross-linking) or by mineral reinforcements (e.g. calcium oxalate). Recently, a new method has been developed, demineralizing, which can remove the mineral reinforcements present in wild silks and enables wet reeling like the commercial silkworm.

Wild silk industry in India
Wild silks are often referred to in India as 'Vanya' silks: The term 'Vanya' is of Sanskrit origin, meaning untamed, wild, or forest-based. Muga, Tasar, and Eri silkworms are not fully tamed and the world calls the silks they produce as 'wild silks'.

India produces four kinds of silk: mulberry, tasar, muga and eri. The silkworm Bombyx mori is fed on mulberry leaves cultivated in plantations. Silkworms are also found wild on forest trees, e.g Antheraea paphia which produces the tasar silk (Tussah). Antheraea paphia feeds on several trees such as Anogeissus latifolia, Terminalia tomentosa, T. arjuna (Terminalia arjuna), Lagerstroemia parviflora and Madhuca indica. Wild silkworm Antheraea assamensis produces muga silk, and another wild silkworm Philosamia synthia ricini (= Samia cynthia) produces eri silk. The estimated annual production of tasar silk is 130 tonnes. Production of other types of silk exceeds 10 000 tonnes (Gupta 1994).

In 2015, Adarsh Gupta K of Nagaraju's research team at Centre for DNA Fingerprinting and Diagnostics, Hyderabad, India, discovered the complete sequence and the protein structure of Muga Silk Fibroin and published it in Scientific Reports.

The eri silk worm from India feeds on the leaves of the castor plant. It is the only completely domesticated silkworm other than Bombyx mori. The silk is extremely durable, but cannot be easily reeled off the cocoon and is thus spun like cotton or wool.

Wild silk industry in China
Some of the best quality wild silk is produced by silkworms in Henan. This is the only type of wild silk that can be easily dyed.

History of wild silk
Wild silk threads have been found and identified from two Indus River sites, Harappa and Chanhu-daro, dating to c. 2450–2000 BCE. This is roughly the same period as the earliest evidence of silk use in China, which is generally thought to have had the oldest silk industry in the world. The specimens of threads from Harappa appear on scanning electron microscope analysis to be from two different species of silk moth, Antheraea paphia and A. assamensis, while the silk from Chanhu-daro may be from a Philosamia species, (eri silk), and this silk appears to have been reeled.

Wild silks were in use in China from early times. Moreover, the Chinese were aware of their use in the Roman Empire and apparently imported goods made from them by the time of the Later Han Dynasty in the 1st to 3rd centuries CE. There are significant indications in the literature that wild silks were in use in Persia and in Greece by the late 5th century BCE, apparently referred to as "Amorgina" or "Amorgian garments" in Greece. Pliny the Elder, in the 1st century CE, obviously had some knowledge of how wild silkworms' cocoons were produced and utilised on the island of Kos for coa vestis, even though his account included some fanciful ideas.

List of some wild silk moths and their silk
 Antheraea assamensis (Helfer, 1837) – from Assam. Its silk has a beautiful glossy golden hue which improves with age and washing. Is never bleached or dyed and is stain resistant. Was reserved for the exclusive use of royal families in Assam for 600 years. In 2015, Centre for DNA Fingerprinting and Diagnostics, Hyderabad, India, discovered the molecular characters of muga silk fibroin which are responsible for the golden luster and tensile strength.
 Antheraea paphia (Linnaeus, 1758) – the "tasar" silkworm.
 Antheraea pernyi (Guénerin-Méneville, 1855) – the Chinese tussah moth. The colour and quality of the silk depends on the climate and soil.
 Antheraea polyphemus – has the most potential of any North American silkworms.
 Antheraea yamamai (Guénerin-Méneville, 1861) – the  silk moth. Has been cultivated in Japan for more than 1000 years. It produces a naturally white silk but does not dye well, though it is very strong and elastic. It is now very rare and expensive.
 Anisota senatoria (J. E. Smith, 1797) – The orange-tipped oakworm moth of North America.
 Automeris io (Fabricius, 1775) – North American moth.
 Bombyx mandarina (Moore) – Possible wild form of B. mori.
 Bombyx sinensis – from China. Prolific but small cocoons.
 Borocera cajani – Malagasy silk worm
 Cricula trifenestrata - from India to the Philippines, Sulawesi, Java, and Sri Lanka.
 Callosamia promethea – from North America.
 Euchiera socialis – the Madrone butterfly from central America.  Produces large silken nests which were used to make a paper-like fabric in the time of Moctezuma II, and have been carded for thread in more recent times.
Eutachyptera psidii – from central America (also known as Gloveria psidii ).  Produces nests that have been used in a similar way to those of Euchiera socialis above.
 Gonometa postica Walker – from the Kalahari region.
 Gonometa rufobrunnea Aurivillius.  Feeds on the mopane tree in southern Africa.
 Hyalophora cecropia – North American. Quality of the silk depends on food source.
 Pachypasa otus  – around the Western Mediterranean. The probable source for Roman coa vestis.
 Samia cynthia (Drury, 1773) – the ailanthus silkmoth, a somewhat domesticated silkworm from China. Introduced into North America. The eri silkmoth from Assam is a subspecies of this moth (S. cynthia ricini). It produces a white silk which resembles wool mixed with cotton, but feels like silk.

Footnotes

References
  
 Hill, John E. 2004. The Peoples of the West. A draft annotated translation of the 3rd century Weilüe – see Appendix E.
 Hill, John E. (2009) Through the Jade Gate to Rome: A Study of the Silk Routes during the Later Han Dynasty, 1st to 2nd Centuries CE. John E. Hill. BookSurge, Charleston, South Carolina. . See p. 25 and "Appendix C - Wild Silks", pp. 477–480.
 
 Tuskes, PM, JP Tuttle and MM Collins. 1996. The wild silk moths of North America. Cornell University Press. 
 
 
 
  (2011): New Method of Unreeling Cocoons Could Extend Silk Industry Beyond Asia. Sciencedaily. here

External links

"South Africa: Development of the wild silk industry"
"Walter Sweadner and the Wild Silk Moths of the Bitteroot (sic) Mountains" by Michael M. Collins
"Anisota senatoria"
"Orange-tipped oakworm moth"

 
Woven fabrics
Lepidoptera and humans
History of Asian clothing
Silk in India